Sir Kenneth Fung Ping-fan, CBE, KStJ, LLD, DSocSc, JP (28 May 1911 – 16 May 2002) was a prominent Hong Kong politician and businessman.

Biography
Fung was born on 28 May 1911 to Fung Ping-shan, a co-founder of the Bank of East Asia, with his twin brother Fung Ping-wah. He graduated from School of Chinese Studies at the University of Hong Kong in 1931.

He took up his family business after his father's death in 1931, becoming the general manager and the director of his family business, the Bank of East Asia. At 28 Fung also established the Fung Ping Fan Group, which in 1975 bought a McDonald's franchise and introduced the fast-food chain to what was then the British colony of Hong Kong. He co-founded the Ocean Park Hong Kong and was a founding chairman of the park.

From 1951 to 1960 he was the appointed unofficial member of the Urban Council of Hong Kong. He was appointed to the Legislative Council of Hong Kong in 1959, in which he served until 1965. From 1962 to 1972 he was the unofficial member of the Executive Council of Hong Kong. For his public services in Hong Kong, Fung was knighted in 1971.

Fung was the founder and president of Hong Kong's World Wide Fund for Nature and was district governor of Rotary International. He was among the first members of the Photographic Society of Hong Kong when it was formed in 1937. He was involved closely in the work of the Scout movement and of the Y.M.C.A. He is a past commissioner of the St. John Ambulance Brigade and was the first chairman of the Duke of Edinburgh's Award Scheme in Hong Kong. He became a member of the Court of the University of Hong Kong in 1948. In 1969 he was given an honorary degree of doctor of social sciences. In 1973 he received the American Academy of Achievement’s Golden Plate Award.

Fung died on 16 May 2002 at the Hong Kong Adventist Hospital, aged 92. He married Ivy Kan Shiu-han and was survived by his four sons and one daughter.

References

1911 births
2002 deaths
Alumni of the University of Hong Kong
Alumni of St. John's Hall, University of Hong Kong
Members of the Executive Council of Hong Kong
Members of the Legislative Council of Hong Kong
Members of the Urban Council of Hong Kong
Hong Kong bankers
Hong Kong philanthropists
Bank of East Asia
Knights of the Order of St John
Officers of the Order of the British Empire
Commanders of the Order of the British Empire
Knights Bachelor
20th-century philanthropists